The Country Girl is a 1950 dramatic play by American playwright Clifford Odets which was subsequently adapted as a film of the same name in 1954, starring Bing Crosby and Grace Kelly.

Uta Hagen played the title role of Georgie Elgin in its original production, with Paul Kelly as her husband Frank, and Steven Hill as theatre director Bernie Dodd. The production was directed by Odets, and ran for 30 weeks, accumulating 235 performances, from November 10, 1950 to June 2, 1951. Hagen received a Tony Award for Best Actress in a Play, and set designer Boris Aronson won for Best Scenic Design.

The play was subsequently remounted on Broadway twice, in 1972 with Maureen Stapleton and Jason Robards, and in 2008, with Frances McDormand and Morgan Freeman. It was also produced twice Off-Broadway, in 1984, with Christine Lahti and Hal Holbrook, and in 1990, with Karen Allen and David Rasche.

The play was produced for television twice, in 1974 with Georgie Elgin played by Shirley Knight, and in 1982 by Faye Dunaway.

References
Notes

External links
 
 
 Character "George Elgin" at the Internet Movie Database

1950 plays
American plays adapted into films
Broadway plays
Plays by Clifford Odets
Plays set in New York City